is a Japanese manga series written and illustrated by Mohiro Kitoh. It was serialized in Kodansha's seinen manga magazine Monthly Afternoon from 1995 to 1997, with its chapters collected in two tankōbon volumes.

Plot
The story is broken up into eight differing sub-stories all involving a series of sentient mechanical puppets known as Vendémiaire (which is also the name of each). These stories all have a similar formula involving a Vendémiaire puppet encountering a boy or man that tries to help them with varying levels of success, usually trying to attain freedom for them. Overall these stories are somber and explore different contrasting opinions of human nature and how  the Vendémiaire are treated by humans, often like slaves or worse. The Vendémiaire puppets have wings, and there is a strong flight motif throughout the various stories.

Publication
Written and illustrated by Mohiro Kitoh, Vendémiaire no Tsubasa was irregularly serialized in Kodansha's seinen manga magazine Monthly Afternoon from 1995 to 1997. Kodansha collected its chapters in two tankōbon volumes, released on April 23 and December 18, 1997. Kodansha republished the series in a shinsoban volume on May 23, 2018.

Volume list

References

Further reading

External links
 

Kodansha manga
Seinen manga